IXICO plc is a UK clinical research firm that provides neuroimaging and digital biomarker analytics to biopharmaceutical firms conducting clinical trials into neurological diseases such as Alzheimer’s disease (AD) and Huntington’s disease (HD).

Company history 
IXICO was incorporated in 2004 as a spin-out from three London academic institutions: Imperial College London, University College London and King's College London. The initial 3-year research project was called ‘Information eXtraction from Images’ (hence the IXI name), and funded by the UK e-science core and other industry partners.

In October 2013, IXICO entered the Alternative Investment Market (AIM) of the London Stock Exchange through a reverse takeover of defunct pharmaceutical drug company Phytopharm.

Phytopharm 
Phytopharm was a British pharmaceutical company, incorporated on 28 November 1995. Briefly known as Lawnhale, it changed its name to Phytopharm in March 1996 and listed on the London Stock Exchange on 25 April of the same year (LSE:PYM). It announced plans for a secondary listing on NASDAQ in 2004 (NASDAQ:PHYOF). By 2012, the Phytopharm group consisted of a parent company, Phytopharm plc, a wholly owned trading subsidiary, Phytotech Limited, and a dormant subsidiary, Phytodevelopments Limited.

Amongst other activity, Phytopharm raised funds for research into treatment of Parkinson’s disease (PD) from sources including the Michael J Fox Foundation, but the company collapsed in 2013 following the failure of its main PD drug (Cogane) during clinical trials. Its shares were suspended from trading on 20 May 2013.

References 

Biotechnology companies of the United Kingdom
British companies established in 2004
Technology companies based in London
Companies listed on the Alternative Investment Market